The Women's triple jump event at the 2011 World Championships in Athletics was held at the Daegu Stadium on August 30 and September 1.

Yargelis Savigne of Cuba had won the last two world titles (2007 and 2009) and led the world rankings before the competition with a jump of 14.99 m. She and Ukrainian Olha Saladuha each had three wins on the Diamond League before the event. Colombia's Caterine Ibargüen was joint number one in the rankings, having set a South American record two weeks earlier. Olga Rypakova, who was dominant in 2010, had the fourth best jump among the entrants with her mark of 14.96 m. Paraskeví Papahrístou, the 2009 runner-up Mabel Gay, and Josleidy Ribalta were the other top-eight ranked athletes to start.

Saladukha popped 14.94 on the third jump of the competition.  Nobody, including Saladukha herself was able to improve upon that through the six rounds.  Defending champion Savigne hurt herself on her second attempt and was not a factor.  Gay made her personal best jump in the fifth round to move into a tie for third.  Ibargüen followed her with her best attempt to move into second place.  Rypakova then followed her with the silver medal winning jump, pushing Ibargüen to third.

Medalists

Records
Prior to the competition, the established records were as follows.

Qualification standards

Schedule

Results

Qualification
Qualification: Qualifying Performance 14.45 (Q) or at least 12 best performers (q) advance to the final.

Final

References

External links
Triple jump results at IAAF website

Triple jump
Triple jump at the World Athletics Championships
2011 in women's athletics